Nyírábrány is a large village in Hajdú-Bihar county, in the Northern Great Plain region of eastern Hungary.

Geography

References

External links

  in Hungarian and English

Populated places in Hajdú-Bihar County